The marimbaphone (not to be confused with the similarly named marimba) is an obsolete tuned percussion instrument, developed by the J.C. Deagan Company of Chicago, Illinois, U.S. in the early 20th century.

The marimbaphone had either shallow steel or wooden bars arranged chromatically with a tube resonator under each bar. Its timbre was similar to the celesta, and it was used mainly by marimba bands and as a solo instrument by stage artists.

In addition to being played with mallets in the conventional way (as in the playing of a marimba or vibraphone), the marimbaphone was designed so that its bars could be rotated from a horizontal position to a vertical position, allowing them to more easily be played with a bow. To further facilitate bowing, the ends of its bars were concave rather than flat.  A single marimbaphone could be played by more than one performer, allowing both techniques to be used simultaneously.

Although the instrument has been comparatively little used in art music (Percy Grainger was one of only a few composers ever to call for it), the name is found in many scores where the ordinary marimba is meant.

Steel marimba 
Also invented by Deagan was the steel marimba, a variation on the steel marimbaphone design that was intended to be played strictly with mallets and not bowed. Both of these instruments were superseded by the invention of the vibraphone in 1927.

See also
Xylorimba
Tuned percussion

References

External links
Deagan Steel Marimbaphone exhibit from Percussive Arts Society Museum site

Keyboard percussion instruments